Eduard Maurits Meijers (10 January 1880, Den Helder – 25 June 1954 in Leiden) was a Dutch jurist of Jewish background, who was the founding father of the current Dutch civil code, the Nieuw Burgerlijk Wetboek.

Biography

Family 
He was the son of Isidor Meijers, a naval physician, and Julie Wolff. Eduard married Tonij Gottschalk on 12 August 1909. The couple would get four daughters.

Career 
In 1897 Meijers entered the University of Amsterdam to study law. He finished his doctorate under Johannes Houwing in April 1903. His dissertation had an emphasis on philosophy, defending utilitarianism against Kant's rationalism and posing that in general well-being should be the final goal of every law institution.

After his studies he ran a law practice in Amsterdam. In 1910 he accepted a chair in private law and private international law at Leiden University. He was particularly interested in legal history and his publications were of great influence on the development of this field in the Netherlands. He became internationally recognized and received honorary degrees from the universities of Aberdeen, Brussels, Glasgow, Leuven, Lille and Paris. From 1918 to 1922 Meijers was dean of the law faculty in Leiden; in 1926 and 1927 he was rector of the university.

Second World War 
The firing of Meijers and other Jewish scientists in 1940 by the German occupiers led Meijers' former graduate student Rudolph Cleveringa to give a widely acclaimed and consequential protest address on 26 November 1940. On 7 August 1942 Meijers, his wife and their youngest daughter were deported to the Westerbork transit camp, on to Camp Barneveld as part of Plan Frederiks, and back to Westerbork in September 1943. In September 1944 he was transported to the Theresienstadt concentration camp in Bohemia. He survived the camps and returned to Leiden on 25 June 1945.

A new Dutch civil code 
On 25 April 1947 Meijers was asked by Royal Order to design a new civil code for the Netherlands (the Burgerlijk Wetboek) to replace the current code, which had been in place since 1838. In 1954, Meijers handed over the design for the first four books, accompanied with an extensive explanation. After Meijers' death that same year, his work was continued by Jan Drion, Jannes Eggens, Frits de Jong and Geert de Grooth. The first book of the new civil code was  codified in 1970, the second in 1976. The last four of the seven books were codified only in 1992, 45 years after Meijers had started the work.

In 1920 Meijers became member of the Royal Netherlands Academy of Arts and Sciences, he was forced to resign in 1942. In 1945 he was readmitted as member.

References

Sources 
 E.M. Meijers and the Recodification of the Dutch Civil Code after World War II"
 Leiden University biography
 

1880 births
1954 deaths
Dutch Jews
20th-century Dutch lawyers
Dutch legal scholars
Jewish scientists
Academic staff of Leiden University
Members of the Royal Netherlands Academy of Arts and Sciences
Westerbork transit camp survivors
People from Den Helder
Theresienstadt Ghetto survivors
University of Amsterdam alumni